Athletes from the Socialist Federal Republic of Yugoslavia competed at the 1992 Winter Olympics in Albertville, France. It was the final Olympic Games for Yugoslavia under this name, which at that point consisted of Bosnia and Herzegovina, Montenegro and Serbia. Republic of Macedonia had become independent but the skier Vesna Dunimagloska participated as part of Yugoslav team.

Croatia and Slovenia participated as independent nations for the first time at these Games, while Bosnia and Herzegovina participated in the 1992 Summer Olympics. Yugoslavia missed the 1994 Winter Olympics because of international sanctions, but a united team of Montenegro and Serbia returned as the Federal Republic of Yugoslavia for the 1998 Winter Olympics. The same year Macedonia made its Winter Olympics debut.

Competitors
The following is the list of number of competitors in the Games.

Alpine skiing

Men

Men's combined

Women

Women's combined

Biathlon

Men

Men's 4 × 7.5 km relay

1A penalty loop of 150 metres had to be skied per missed target. 
2One minute added per missed target.

Bobsleigh

Cross-country skiing

Men

1 Starting delay based on 10 km results. 
C = Classical style, F = Freestyle

Luge

Men

Speed skating

Men

References

Official Olympic Reports
International Olympic Committee results database
 Olympic Winter Games 1992, full results by sports-reference.com

Nations at the 1992 Winter Olympics
1992
Olympics